The 2014 Richmond Spiders football team represented the University of Richmond in the 2014 NCAA Division I FCS football season. They were led by third-year head coach Danny Rocco and played their home games at E. Claiborne Robins Stadium. The Spiders were a member of the Colonial Athletic Association. They finished the season 9–5, 5–3 in CAA play to finish in fourth place. They received an at-large bid to the FCS Playoffs where they defeated Morgan State in the first round before losing in the second round to Coastal Carolina.

Schedule

Source: Schedule

Roster

Ranking movements

References

Richmond
Richmond Spiders football seasons
Richmond
Richmond Spiders football